The Department of Budget and Management (DBM) is an executive body under the Office of the President of the Philippines. It is responsible for the sound and efficient use of government resources for national development and also as an instrument for the meeting of national socio-economic and political development goals.

The department has four undersecretaries and four assistant secretaries.

History
At the beginning of the 20th century, the Second Philippine Commission, acting as a legislative body, enacted appropriations measures for the annual expenditures of the government. This was in accordance with the Philippine Bill of 1902, which decreed that disbursements from the national treasury were to be authorized only in pursuance of appropriations made by law.

With the passage of the Jones Law in 1916, the Philippine Legislature was set up with two chambers: the Philippine Senate and the House of Representative. The governor-general was to submit, within 10 days of the opening of the legislature's regular session, the annual budget. Two years later, the Council of the State was formed to prepare the budget that the governor-general was required to submit to the Philippine Legislature.

A budget office was formed to assist in the preparation, enactment and implementation of such appropriations made by law. Four divisions made up the Office: a budget division took charge of agency regular budgets; an expense-central division took care of special budgets; a service inspection division screened appointments and requests for the creation of positions, and an administrative division handled routine administrative matters.

The Constitution of 1935 established both budget policy and procedure, which were amplified in a series of laws and executive acts over the years.

The Budget Commission was established by Executive Order (EO) No. 25 issued on April 25, 1936. It became a ministry by virtue of Presidential Decree (PD) No. 1405, signed on June 11, 1978. Following the pattern in the United States Federal Government, the Budget Commission was, and the Ministry of the Budget continued to be, part of the Office of the President and separate from the other fiscal agencies of government that form part of the Ministry of Finance.

The first budget law was passed on December 17, 1937, as Commonwealth Act (CA) No. 246. It took effect on January 1, 1938, providing for a line-item budget as the framework of the government's budgeting system. CA No. 246 called for a "balanced budget" emphasizing matching proposed expenditures with existing revenues.

On June 4, 1954, Republic Act (RA) No. 992, otherwise called the Revised Budget Act, was enacted providing for an enhanced role of the Budget Commission as the fiscal arm and budgeting adviser of the President. The preparation of the budget was to include the aggregation of the programs of the different departments and agencies of the Government. At this point, a performance budgeting system was introduced.

The Integrated Reorganization Plan of 1972, under Presidential Decree No. 1, implanted re-organizational changes in the Budget Commission with four of its units retained: the Budget Operations Office; National Accounting Office; Management Office; and Wage and Position Classification Office (GWAPOCO). Five staff units were provided the commission: for planning service; for financial and administrative services; or training and information services; a legislative staff; and a data processing center.

The change to a parliamentary form of government was instituted by the 1973 Constitution. The legislative branch of the government then referred to as the Batasang Pambansa, saw the minister in charge of the budget, chairing the Committee on Appropriations and Reorganization. Through the Budget Reform Decree of 1977, the planning, programming and budgeting linkages of the ministry were further strengthened.

The 1973 Philippine Constitution was superseded by the Provisional Constitution under Proclamation No. 3 of President Corazon C. Aquino. The legislative power was temporarily reposed on the president. Budgetary functions once more were exercised by the Office of Budget and Management.

EO No. 292, issued pursuant to the 1987 Constitution, provided for major organizational subdivisions of the Department of Budget and Management.

In 1992, under Fidel V. Ramos, government budgeting aimed to make the National Budget an instrument for breaking the boom and bust cycle that had characterized the Philippine economy in the past. Beyond sustaining the operations of government and its projects, the budget became an economic stimulus and a means to disperse the gains of economic development.

At the outset of Joseph Estrada's presidency, the Asian financial crisis that characterized the period prompted the national leadership to take a second look at the country's economic policies and strategies. To maintain macroeconomic stability in light of the effects of the economic turmoil, the government had to raise domestic demand by sustaining expenditures and pump-priming the areas of public infrastructure and social services. It had to adopt an expansionary fiscal policy by allowing a reasonable level of cyclical deficit to be financed largely through foreign borrowing while offsetting the negative impact of the deficit by introducing structural reforms in the budget process.

During this period, from mid-1998 to end of 2000, the DBM continued to introduce budgeting reforms that were meant to improve cash management, reduce uncertainty in the allotment and cash flow, and enhance transparency and accountability.

Under President Gloria Macapagal Arroyo, the DBM focused its efforts on deepening fiscal responsibility, enhancing the efficiency of public expenditures, and promoting good governance. Along with these major areas of concern, it intensified efforts at strengthening inter-governmental relations, eliciting increased participation from the private sector in the overall budget process and in intensifying public information on the administration's fiscal policy, thrusts, and budget policies and procedures. It likewise stepped up efforts at enhancing internal management in line with its vision to be seen as an organization that influences the spending behavior and management of resources of agencies towards transparency, equity, and accountability.

On April 25, 2011, the department celebrated its 75th anniversary. It was kicked off with a flag-raising ceremony and a signing of a pledge of commitment by all its employees and executives, including Sec. Florencio Abad. In the evening of the same day, the entire DBM family went to the Philippine International Convention Center in Pasay for a grand ball in honor of the department's service to the country. President Benigno S. Aquino III graced the event and delivered his speech. On the other hand, Antonietta "Nonette" Arquiza of DBM Regional Office IX was given the title Miss DBM by renowned fashion guru Mama Renee Salud in the spirit of fun as DBM celebrates its 75th anniversary.

Bureaus
 Budget Operations Office
 Budget and Management Bureau A
 Coverage:
  • Department of Finance (DOF)
  • Department of Public Works and Highways (DPWH)
  • Department of Tourism (DOT)
  • Department of Trade and Industry (DTI)
  • Department of Transportation (DOTr)
  • National Economic and Development Authority (NEDA)
  • Mindanao Development Authority
 • Legislative-Executive Development Advisory Council (LEDAC)
 • Cooperative Development Authority (CDA)

 Budget and Management Bureau B
 Coverage:
  • Department of Health (DOH)
  • Department of Labor and Employment (DOLE)
  • Department of Social Welfare and Development (DSWD)
  • Commission on the Filipino Language (CFL)
  • Film Development Council of the Philippines (FDCP)
  • Housing and Land Use Regulatory Board (HLURB)
  • Housing and Urban Development Coordinating Council (HUDCC)
 • Movie and Television Review and Classification Board (MTRCB)
  • National Anti-Poverty Commission (NAPC)
  • National Commission for Culture and the Arts (NCCA)
  • National Historical Commission of the Philippines
  • National Library of the Philippines
  • National Archives of the Philippines
  • National Commission on Indigenous Peoples
  • Optical Media Board (OMB)
  • Philippine Commission on Women
  • Philippine Sports Commission (PSC)
  • Presidential Commission for the Urban Poor

 Budget and Management Bureau C
 Coverage:
  • Office of the President (OP)
  • Office of the Vice President (OVP)
 • Department of Budget and Management (DBM)
  • Presidential Communications Operations Office (PCOO)
  • Career Executive Service Board
  • Congress of the Philippines
  • Civil Service Commission (CSC)
  • Commission On Audit (COA)
  • Commission on Elections (COMELEC)
  • Development Academy of the Philippines
 • Anti-Money Laundering Council (AMLC)
  • Games and Amusements Board (GAB)
  • Government-Owned and/or – Controlled Corporations (GOCCs)
  • Philippine Institute for Development Studies
  • Philippine Racing Commission
  • Presidential Legislative Liaison Office (PLLO)
  • Presidential Management Staff (PMS)
  • Senate

 Budget and Management Bureau D
 Coverage:
 • Department of Foreign Affairs (DFA)
  • Department of Interior and Local Government (DILG)
  • Department of Justice (DOJ)
  • Department of National Defense (DND)
  • The Judiciary
  • Autonomous Region in Muslim Mindanao (ARMM)
  • Office of the Ombudsman
  • Commission on Human Rights
  • Commission on Filipinos Overseas
  • Dangerous Drugs Board (DDB)
  • National Commission on Muslim Filipinos
  • National Intelligence Coordinating Agency (NICA)
  • National Security Council (NSC)
  • Office of the Presidential Adviser on the Peace Process
  • Philippine Drug Enforcement Agency (PDEA)
  • International Commitments Fund

 Budget and Management Bureau E
  Coverage:
  • Department of Agrarian Reform (DAR)
  • Department of Agriculture (DA)
  • Department of Energy (DOE)
  • Department of Environment and Natural Resources (DENR)
  • Department of Information and Communications Technology (DICT)
  • Climate Change Commission
  • Energy Regulatory Commission
  • Fertilizer and Pesticide Authority
  • Pasig River Rehabilitation Commission
  • National Disaster Risk Reduction and Management Fund (NDRRMF)

 Budget and Management Bureau F
 Coverage:
  • Monitoring and Evaluation
  • Department of Education (DepEd)
  • Department of Science and Technology (DOST)
  • Commission on Higher Education (CHED)
  • State Universities and Colleges (SUCs)
  • University of the Philippines
  • Mindanao State University

 Local Government and Regional Coordination Bureau
 Coverage:
  • Internal Revenue Allotment (IRA)
  • Allocation to Local Government Units

Attached agencies
 Government Procurement Policy Board-Technical Support Office
 Procurement Service

List of the Secretaries of the Department of Budget and Management

The current secretary of the department is Amenah F. Pangandaman, appointed on June 30, 2022.

References

External links
Department of Budget and Management

 
Philippines, Budget and Management
Philippines
Budget and Management
Government finances in the Philippines